A Woofer in Tweeter's Clothing is the second studio album by the American rock band Sparks. It was released in 1973 and includes the single "Girl from Germany". It was the last release by the original five-member incarnation of Sparks.

The album was recorded and mixed at ID Sound at La Brea and Walley Heider Studios, and produced by Thaddeus James Lowe, then Todd Rundgren's engineer and former lead singer of The Electric Prunes. Receiving mixed to positive reviews, it was originally released as an LP in January 1973. The artwork was photographed by Larry DuPont and Ron Mael.

Release
A Woofer in Tweeter's Clothing was released in February 1972. It was not very successful and did not reach the Billboard 200 in the US. After the group's surprise success in the UK, "Girl from Germany" was belatedly released as a single there but did not chart.

The album did, however, lead to a tour of the United Kingdom, including a residency at the Marquee in London, which, despite much heckling during performances, helped them to secure a significant cult following. An appearance on the BBC Television's Old Grey Whistle Test led to wider interest, regardless of a cold reception from the show's host Bob Harris.

Re-issue
A Woofer in Tweeter's Clothing has been re-released numerous times since 1972. It is often packaged with its predecessor Sparks. One such re-issue was released in 1975 to capitalize on the group's success in the UK. This version was titled 2 Originals of Sparks and was packaged as a double-LP in a gatefold sleeve with a 14-page booklet.

In 1988, the album was first issued on CD, again in tandem with the first Sparks album, but in order to fit both programs within the constraints of a single disc, the last four tracks of the album were mastered at a higher speed than on the original LP, shortening the running time to 39:27.  Though the album has subsequently been reissued in a standalone format, including the most recent reissue on Rhino Encore, released in 2008, the sped-up master has continued to be used.

Reception

A Woofer In Tweeter's Clothing received mixed to positive reviews by the majority of critics.

Track listing

Personnel
Sparks
 Russell Mael - vocals
 Ron Mael - keyboards
 Earle Mankey - guitar
 Jim Mankey - bass
 Harley Feinstein - drums

References

External links
Sparks – The "A Woofer In Tweeter's Clothing" album files

Sparks (band) albums
1973 albums
Bearsville Records albums
Repertoire Records albums
Wounded Bird Records albums
Victor Entertainment albums